Hardanger may be:

 Hardanger, a region in Vestland, Norway, consisting of the municipalities of Ullensvang, Eidfjord, Ulvik and Voss
 Hardangerfjord, a fjord around which the landscape of Hardanger is centered
 A mountain plateau in Norway, Hardangervidda
 Hardanger fiddle, a Norwegian stringed instrument
 Hardanger embroidery, a form of whitework hand embroidery from the district of the same name
 Hardanger cloth, a special kind of evenweave fabric used for Hardanger embroidery and other counted-thread embroidery